Michael Rocco is an American football quarterback. He played college football for the Virginia Cavaliers and the University of Richmond Spiders football team.

Personal
Michael Rocco is the nephew of former UVA football assistant Danny Rocco and now head football coach of University of Richmond. His grandfather served as an assistant under Penn State head coach Joe Paterno.

High school
Michael Rocco attended Liberty Christian Academy in Lynchburg, Virginia. He was a four-year starter at Liberty Christian as he passed for 2,066 yards, 24 touchdowns and rushed for seven scores as a junior in 2008. In 2009, he suffered a broken left arm and dislocated left wrist before the start of his senior season. He eventually returned for Liberty Christian's final five regular season games and led the Bulldogs to the 2009 VIS state championship game, passing for 235 yards and three touchdowns in a 48–28 loss to Collegiate School (Richmond, Virginia).  He was rated the overall number 109th quarterback in the nation by ESPN.

College
Michael Rocco appeared in six of Virginia's 12 games as true freshmen. He played under starting quarterback Marc Verica. He went 4-of-6 with a touchdown for 64 yards in his collegiate debut against Virginia Military Institute He went a perfect 3-of-3 for 12 yards in the second quarter at Boston College on November 20. He completed at least one pass in every appearance which included games against VMI, University of North Carolina, Eastern Michigan University, Maryland, Boston College, and Virginia Tech. He competed with redshirt sophomore Ross Metheny, redshirt freshman Michael Strauss, and true freshman David Watford for the starting job for the 2011 season.

As spring practice ended, and going into fall camp, Rocco began to separate himself from the other players. In the last two weeks of fall camp, the majority of the reps were given to both Rocco and true freshman David Watford who began to improve dramatically. During a press conference a week before the season opener, coach Mike London named Rocco the starter, and also stated that Watford will share time with him as well. On September 3, UVA opened their season at home against William and Mary. Rocco played well in his first start, completing 21 of 29 passes for 174 yards with neither a touchdown or interception. He will again split snaps with the speedy Watford for upcoming games. In the second game of the season at Indiana, Rocco struggled to throw the ball down field while throwing two interceptions. He completed 15 of 29 passes and threw for 191 yards. UVA gave up a 20-point lead as the Hoosiers scored 28 unanswered following different turnovers by the cavs, which included an ugly interception by Rocco. He responded well on the next drive, driving the Hoos 77 yards for a touchdown, and a game-tying two-point conversion. He threw two game-winning touchdowns to tight end Jake McGee to win the Penn State and University of Miami game.

After the conclusion of his junior season at UVA, he transferred to the University of Richmond.  However, the NCAA denied his waiver to play immediately, and he sat out the 2013 season. Rocco started the 2014 season as the backup to quarterback Michael Strauss at Richmond. He scored his first touchdown of the season against his former team, the University of Virginia, on September 6, 2014.

External links
 http://rivals.yahoo.com/ncaa/football/recruiting/player-Mike-Rocco-91750
 http://espn.go.com/college-football/player/_/id/501176/michael-rocco

Year of birth missing (living people)
Living people
American football quarterbacks
Virginia Cavaliers football players
Sportspeople from Lynchburg, Virginia
Players of American football from Virginia
Richmond Spiders football players